Danuel Jurgeleit (born 15 December 1963) is a German former footballer.

References

External links

1963 births
Living people
People from Ratingen
Sportspeople from Düsseldorf (region)
Footballers from North Rhine-Westphalia
German footballers
Association football midfielders
Association football forwards
Bundesliga players
2. Bundesliga players
SG Union Solingen players
FC 08 Homburg players
SpVgg Unterhaching players
VfB Lübeck players
Eintracht Braunschweig players
Holstein Kiel players
20th-century German people